Enzo Couacaud (born 1 March 1995) is a French-Mauritian professional tennis player. He has a career high singles ranking of world No. 155, which he achieved on 14 February 2022 and a doubles ranking of world No. 188 achieved on 8 March 2021.

Career

2015: Grand Slam doubles debut
Couacaud received a wildcard to enter the doubles main draw in the 2015 French Open with doubles partner Quentin Halys, losing in the first round. 

He competed in the 2015 Wimbledon singles qualifying event, losing to John Millman in the third qualifying round.

2021: Grand Slam singles debut and first win
Couacaud made his Grand Slam singles main draw debut at the 2021 French Open as a wildcard where he defeated Egor Gerasimov to reach the second round.

2022-23: Wimbledon, US and Australian Open debut
In May 2022, Couacaud was awarded a wildcard into the main draw of the 2022 French Open in doubles partnering Manuel Guinard.

He qualified for the 2022 Wimbledon Championships making his debut at this Major. He also qualified for the next Major making his debut at the US Open.

In January 2023, Couacaud qualified for the 2023 Australian Open making his debut at this Major. He reached the second round, taking a set off eventual champion Novak Djokovic but lost in four sets.

ATP Challenger and ITF Futures career finals

Singles: 23 (14 titles, 9 runners-up, 1 not contested)

Doubles: 11 (5 titles, 6 runners-up)

Singles performance timeline

Record against top 10 players

Junior Grand Slam finals

Doubles: 1 (1 runner-up)

References

External links
 
 

1995 births
Living people
French male tennis players
French people of Mauritian descent
Mauritian tennis players